York was a provincial electoral district for the Legislative Assembly of New Brunswick, Canada in the southwestern portion of the province. It was created in 1995 from a large part of the former York South and a small part of York North.

Members of the Legislative Assembly

Election results

References

External links 
The Legislative Assembly of New Brunswick

Former provincial electoral districts of New Brunswick